The National Forest Policy, 1988 is an Act of the Parliament of India to revise the previously enacted National Forest Policy of 1952. The 1988 National Forest Policy strongly suggested the idea of empowering and involving local communities in the protection and development of forests. A direct outcome of the National Forest Policy, 1988 was the Joint Forest Management Program (JFM /JFMP) instituted in 1990 by the Government of India. It was started on a pilot project basis in West Bengal as early as 1971, and again in the late 1980s with considerable success.

History 
Several legislation in India focused on improving environmental quality since the enactment of the National Forest Policy of 1952. The Indian Parliament passed the Wildlife Protection Act, 1972, Water Act in 1974, Air Act, 1981, the Forest Conservation Act in 1980 and the Environment Protection Act in 1986.

References

Law of India
Acts of the Parliament of India 1988
Forest administration in India
History of forestry in India